Dizan (also Romanized as Dīzān) is a village in Justan Rural District of Bala Taleqan District, Taleqan County, Alborz province, Iran. At the 2006 census, its population was 570 in 194 households. The latest census in 2016 counted 665 people in 248 households; it is the largest village in its rural district.

References 

Taleqan County

Populated places in Alborz Province

Populated places in Taleqan County